Willi Gabriel (born 24 September 1939) is a German archer. He competed in the men's individual event at the 1976 Summer Olympics.

References

1939 births
Living people
German male archers
Olympic archers of West Germany
Archers at the 1976 Summer Olympics
People from Dzierżoniów County